Renshi Zhuan (任氏传) (translated into English as The Story of Lady Jen or Miss Jen) is a Chinese supernatural tale by Shen Jiji (c. 800). The story tells of the romance between a man and a fox-fairy who takes the form of a beautiful woman.

Plot

Wei Yin and Cheng were friends, and cousins, who were always together and were both fond of wine and beautiful women. Although they spent so much of their lives together, they had very different personalities and views on life which became apparent when Cheng married. In the middle of one summer, Cheng came across a beautiful woman accompanied by 2 handmaidens. The beautiful lady was "dressed in white and of an enchanting beauty". He was captured by her otherworldly looks and offered his donkey for her to ride, saying that a beautiful girl like herself should not have to walk. They became engrossed in conversation for so long that Cheng wound up at a large mansion that night, where the lady, named Miss Jen, lived. Miss Jen asked Cheng to wait a moment while she went inside to prepare something for him. After being invited in, they feasted and drank several goblets of wine and lay together that night.

After leaving the next morning, Cheng could not get the beautiful Miss Jen off his mind. As he was traveling home through a neighboring village he asked about he mansion he has just come from; according to the local proprietor no such mansion existed in that area, only a gate and broken down walls. Cheng could hardly believe this as he had spent the night at this wonderful place and he told the proprietor such. The proprietor suspected that it was the local fox spirit, who liked to beguile men into staying the night with her. After several weeks had passed without his spotting the lady again, Cheng finally stumbled across her in the market place. She knew that Cheng had figured out her secret and was shocked that he would seek her out again. Cheng professed his love for her and proclaimed that he would take care of her and find her a place to live if she would marry him. After some convincing, Miss Jen agreed.

Not long after their marriage, Cheng's cousin Wei Yin met Miss Jen; he didn't believe at first that his cousin had found such a beautiful woman to be his wife. Because of his disbelief, he went to Cheng's house to see his new bride one day after Cheng had left. Stunned by her beauty, Wei Yin tried to make a move on Miss Jen and intended to rape her. Miss Jen fought against him but was too weak to break free of his hold, so instead she asked him to hold off for just a moment and became very sad. When asked why she looked so upset, Miss Jen said it was because she felt bad for Cheng because she was all that he has in life that was nice while Wei was rich and had had many beauties; if Wei Yin were to take her as well, Cheng would be left with nothing. This brought Wei to his senses and he apologized to Miss Jen.

After this misunderstanding, the two became close and often spent time together. Miss Jen also pulled strings to get a nice wife for Wei because of his honorable actions but he was never satisfied. Miss Jen would try to help both men by bribing families to get new women for Wei and to make more money for Cheng. Because of Jen's frequent advice, Cheng was able to secure a nice position in work and get a good deal on a blemished imperial horse. However, although Miss Jen had proven to be insightful and powerful, Cheng was hesitant to take her word on matters whereas Wei Yin never questioned her methods.

Cheng had obtained a lawful wife during this time but wanted to bring Miss Jen to his new post; at first Miss Jen refused and stated that a shamaness had told her that it would be unlucky for her if she were to travel west during that time of year. Cheng wouldn't take no for an answer and Miss Jen was forced to pack up and begin travelling west with Cheng to his new post. Not long after their journey started, the group came across several hunting dogs in the area. Because of this, Miss Jen turned into her true form (a fox) and took off into the fields to try to flee from the dogs. She was unfortunately unsuccessful and was killed by the hounds. 

Cheng was greatly upset that Miss Jen had been killed thanks to his foolishness, and so he spent his own money to give her a proper burial and erected a grave marker to her. When he returned home, Wei Yin asked to see Miss Jen only to be informed by Cheng that she had been killed by hunting hounds. Wei Yin couldn't understand how some dogs, even though fierce, were able to kill a human. This is when Cheng revealed Miss Jen's true nature as a fox-fairy to his cousin, who in disbelief travelled to her grave to dig up her body and see for himself that she was indeed a fox. 

The story ends there with a brief look into Cheng's future, which turned out to be wealthy and prosperous.

Legacy

Shen JiJi's Renshi zhuan is thought to have invented the 'fox romance' genre, and as such influenced works such as the Liaozhai Zhiyi; it was popular during the Ming Dynasty and Qing Dynasty, and was included several compilations including the Yu Chu zhi (虞初志), and Taiping Guangji (太平廣記).

Background Information

Female fox spirits were a popular narrative in Pre-Modern Chinese literature (and still is to this day). Because ideal women from those times were described as enchantingly beautiful and clever it was easy to combine that with the cunning nature of foxes to create this incredibly enchanting women who were sly and hard to keep. Many of these stories follow the narrative of the fox women seducing men for their needs and lives, the story of Miss Jen if incredibly different. Although Miss Jen (also stylized as Miss Ren) portrayed some of the typical aspects of fox folks (beauty, magic, seduction) she was not dangerous or out to harm anyone. She protected her chastity against her husband's cousin and did her best to use her charms and powers to benefit both her husband and her husband's cousin.

Analysis

This story was beautifully written and had many different aspects from typical supernatural stories from Pre-Modern Chinese literatures. It is because of these differences that make this such a timeless and popular piece. The narrative also leaves room for the audience to interpret different avenues in the story. Why didn't Cheng take his Miss Jen's warning about her impending doom when all he previous advise had come true and benefited him? It may have been that because he knew she was not a mortal, he assumed that no harm would come to her even though he never asked her the true extent of her powers and knowledge. Also, did Wei Yin keep rejecting the women that Jen found for him because he was in love with her? Whereas Cheng treated her as a normal human and gave no thoughts to her powers (even though he knew she was not human) Wei Yin held Jen in high regards and always heeded her words even though he did not know of her true nature while she was live. Would Wei have been a better husband for Jen? Would she have lived longer if she hadn't married Cheng? It's hard to say, but we can interpret our own meanings and intentions from the narrative.

References

External links
https://meaganj.bergbuilds.domains/hst107/female-foxes-in-ancient-china/

Short stories by Shen Jiji
Literature featuring anthropomorphic foxes
Works set in the 8th century
Short stories set in the Tang dynasty
Short stories set in Shaanxi
Stories within Taiping Guangji
Paranormal romance